Gubernatorial election will be held on Jakarta in 2024 to elect the Governor of Jakarta to a five-year term.

According to the law, if no candidate secured a majority of the votes, a runoff election would be held between the top two candidates.

Candidates 
Under regulations, only political parties having 22 seats or more in the regional parliament (DPRD) can put forward a candidate. Political parties with fewer seats can put forward a candidate only if they have acquired support from other political parties. Independent candidates are able to run if they have gathered at least 532,213 signatures from local residents, which will be verified by the local election committee.

Potential 
The following are the figures who are said to be able to run for the 2024 Jakarta gubernatorial election, prior to the opening of registration for the pairs of candidates for Governor and Vice Governor.
Agus Harimurti Yudhoyono, Chairman of Partai Demokrat
Ahmad Riza Patria, former Vice Governor of Jakarta
Ahmad Sahroni, member of People's Representative Council
Airin Rachmi Diany, former Mayor of South Tangerang
Anies Baswedan, former Governor of Jakarta
Gibran Rakabuming Raka, Mayor of Surakarta
Tri Rismaharini, Minister of Social Affairs

Political map

Parliamentary chairs 
Results of 2019 Indonesian general election in Jakarta there were 10 political parties with a total of 106 seats in Jakarta Regional People's Representative Council, namely:

Opinion polls

Pre-election polls

Notes

References 

Elections in Jakarta
2024 Indonesian gubernatorial elections
2020s in Jakarta